Imazu may refer to:

People
Eddie Imazu (1897–1979), Japanese art director
Hiroshi Imazu (born 1946), Japanese politician of the Liberal Democratic Party, a member of the House of Representatives in the Diet

Places
Ōmi-Imazu Station, a railway station in Takashima, Shiga Prefecture, Japan
Hankyū Imazu Line, a commuter rail line in Hyōgo Prefecture, Japan
Imazu, Shiga, a town located in former Takashima District, Shiga, Japan
Imazu Station (Ōita), a train station in Nakatsu, Ōita Prefecture, Japan
Imazu Station (Hyōgo), a train station in Nishinomiya, Hyōgo Prefecture, Japan